Phillip Henriques is a Jamaican politician, who has represented Clarendon North Western in the Parliament of Jamaica since 2020.

Political career 
Henriques was elected on a recount defeating incumbent MP Richard Azan.

References 

Living people
21st-century Jamaican politicians
Jamaica Labour Party politicians
Members of the House of Representatives of Jamaica
People from Clarendon Parish, Jamaica
Year of birth missing (living people)
Members of the 14th Parliament of Jamaica